Syed Abdul Aleem is a Pakistani politician who was a Member of the Provincial Assembly of the Punjab, from 2002 to 2007 then from May 2013 to May 2018.He was also a nazim from 2000 till 2001. Before that he was also involved in student politics and was president of the Muslim Student Federation Pakistan from 1997 till 1999.

Early life and education
He was born on 24 April 1968 in Dera Ghazi Khan.

He completed his graduation in 1994 from University of the Punjab.

Political career

He was elected to the Provincial Assembly of the Punjab as an independent candidate from Constituency PP-244 (Dera Ghazi Khan-V) in 2013 Pakistani general election. He joined Pakistan Muslim League (N) in May 2013.

References

Living people
Punjab MPAs 2013–2018
1968 births
Pakistan Muslim League (N) politicians